Let's Call This... Esteem is a live album by soprano saxophonist Steve Lacy and pianist Mal Waldron recorded in Oxford in 1993 and released on the Slam label.

Reception

The Allmusic review by Steve Loewy stated: "While this one differs only minutely from some of the other collaborations between these two outstanding musicians, the rewards are plentiful, and both the novice and experienced listener will thrill to the nuanced excitement."

Track listing
 Introduction/"Let's Call This..." (Thelonious Monk) – 6:59
 "Monk's Dream" (Monk) – 5:23
 "In a Sentimental Mood" (Duke Ellington, Manny Kurtz, Irving Mills) – 8:17
 "Snake Out" (Mal Waldron) – 14:00
 "Blues for Aida" (Steve Lacy) – 7:27
 "Johnny Come Lately" (Billy Strayhorn) – 6:53
 "What It Is" (Waldron) – 9:05
 "Evidence" (Monk) – 6:55
 "Epistrophy" (Monk, Kenny Clarke) – 5:17
 "Esteem" (Lacy) – 7:50

Personnel
Steve Lacy – soprano saxophone 
Mal Waldron – piano

References

1993 live albums
Mal Waldron live albums
Steve Lacy (saxophonist) live albums